The London Review of International Law is a scholarly journal.  Its first issue was published in September, 2013.

Gerry Simpson, a Professor at the London School of Economics, is one of the current editors.

References

Law journals